Thunnus tonggol is a species of tuna of tropical Indo-West Pacific waters.

It is commonly known as the longtail tuna or northern bluefin tuna. The usage of the latter name, mainly in Australia to distinguish it from the southern bluefin tuna, leads to easy confusion with Thunnus thynnus of the Atlantic and Thunnus orientalis of the North Pacific. Compared to these "true" bluefins, Thunnus tonggol is more slender and has shorter pectoral fins.

Compared to similar-sized tunas, its growth is slower and it lives longer, which may make it vulnerable to overfishing.

See also
List of fish in the Red Sea
List of fishes of India

References

External links

Fish described in 1851
Fish of Thailand
tonggol